Lucien Duboscq (1893-1935) was a French stage actor. He also starred in two films, including the 1933 drama In Old Alsace.

He was a member of the Comédie-Française.

References

Bibliography
 Crisp, Colin. French Cinema—A Critical Filmography: Volume 1, 1929-1939. Indiana University Press, 2015.

External links

1893 births
1935 deaths
20th-century French male actors
French male stage actors
French male film actors